Filippos Selkos (born 11 August 1999) is a Greek professional footballer who plays as a forward for ASC 09 Dortmund.

References

1999 births
Living people
Greek footballers
Greek expatriate footballers
Super League Greece players
Panionios F.C. players
Association football forwards
People from Castrop-Rauxel
Sportspeople from Münster (region)